California's 32nd State Assembly district is one of 80 California State Assembly districts. It is currently represented by Democrat Rudy Salas of Bakersfield.

District profile 
The district is located in the southwestern Central Valley, anchored by the cities of Bakersfield and Hanford. The district is mainly agricultural and heavily Latino.

Kern County – 37.4%
 Arvin
 Bakersfield – 21.9%
 Delano
 Lamont
 McFarland
 Shafter
 Wasco

All of Kings County
 Avenal
 Corcoran
 Hanford
 Lemoore

Election results from statewide races

List of Assembly Members
Due to redistricting, the 32nd district has been moved around different parts of the state. The current iteration resulted from the 2011 redistricting by the California Citizens Redistricting Commission.

Election results 1992 - present

2020

2018

2016

2014

2012

2010

2008

2006

2004

2002

2000

1998

1996

1994

1992

See also 
 California State Assembly
 California State Assembly districts
 Districts in California

References

External links 
 District map from the California Citizens Redistricting Commission

32
Government of Kern County, California
Government of Kings County, California
Government of Bakersfield, California
Corcoran, California
Hanford, California
Lemoore, California